The Fullerton Inn, also known as the Jacktown Inn, Jacksonville Hotel, and Fullerton-Sverdrup House, is an historic inn and tavern which is located in North Huntingdon Township, Westmoreland County, Pennsylvania.

It was added to the National Register of Historic Places on June 30, 1983.

Hisory and architectural features
Built in 1798 by William Fullerton, this structure is a two-and-one-half-story, four-bay, stone building, which was designed in the Federal style. 

A five-bay, wood-frame addition was built in 1805. Both sections have gable roofs.  

It operated as an inn into the late-19th century.

This structure was added to the National Register of Historic Places on June 30, 1983.

References

Hotel buildings on the National Register of Historic Places in Pennsylvania
Federal architecture in Pennsylvania
Commercial buildings completed in 1805
Buildings and structures in Westmoreland County, Pennsylvania
1805 establishments in Pennsylvania
National Register of Historic Places in Westmoreland County, Pennsylvania